Whitton is a hamlet and civil parish in Shropshire, England.

There is a parish church in the hamlet.

Whitton Court is a grade I listed manor house dating from 1611, previously the home of Lord Mayor of London Sebastian Harvey, and members of the Charlton family.

The village church, St Mary The Virgin, is notable for stained-glass by Sir Edward Burne-Jones and William Morris of c. 1893 in the east window.

See also
 Listed buildings in Whitton, Shropshire

References

Villages in Shropshire
Civil parishes in Shropshire